Subdivisions of the canton of Ticino, Switzerland, are the 108 comuni (and the 25 quarters of the municipality of Lugano) grouped into 38 circoli, which in turn form a part or the whole of one of the eight districts.

Districts and circles

The eight districts (distretti) are historic and are maintained by the constitution of the Republic and Canton of Ticino.

Leventina was a subject of the canton of Uri until 1798, the year the Helvetic Republic was founded, when it became part of the new canton of Bellinzona along with the Swiss condominiums of Bellinzona, Riviera and Blenio. The condominiums of Locarno, Lugano, Mendrisio and Vallemaggia became part of the new canton of Lugano in 1798. These two cantons formed into one canton — Ticino — in 1803 when it joined the (restored) Swiss Confederation as a member canton. The former condominiums and Leventina became the eight districts of the canton of Ticino.

The circles (circoli) in the present era, similar to the districts, serve only as an administrative territorial entity with limited public functions, most notably the local judiciary. Those shown below in italics are former or proposed circles. They are effectively sub-districts, though the smallest district (Riviera) has only one circle.

The following is the current establishment of municipalities, circles and districts.

Municipalities

The municipalities, or communes/communities (comuni) have since the late 1990s seen a steady series of mergers, bringing the total number down from 245 in 1995 to 108 in 2021, with further mergers planned. The constitution of the canton allows for the Grand Council of Ticino to promote and lead in deciding on mergers, and where it does so only advisory referendums are held in the municipalities affected.

Quarters
The municipality and city of Lugano is subdivided into 25 quartieri (quarters) which are grouped into three (cantonal) circles.

Quarters 1–9 are the city's older quarters, which have been recently added to by successive enlargements of the municipality in 2004, 2008 and 2013; these enlargements involved previously independent municipalities becoming quarters of Lugano.

References
Official list of municipalities, circles and districts of Ticino